Ellen Stone may refer to:

 Ellen Maria Stone, American Protestant missionary kidnapped during the Miss Stone Affair
 Ellen Stone (horn player) (born 1917), American instrumentalist